Cottesloe railway station is a railway station on the Transperth network. It is located on the Fremantle line, 12.4 kilometres from Perth station serving the suburbs of Cottesloe and Peppermint Grove.

History
Cottesloe station was originally established as Bullens Siding in 1884. Robert Napoleon Bullen was the proprietor of the Albion Hotel. The station was a request stop. Passengers could stop the train with a provided red flag in daylight or a candle in a jar at night. In June 1892 the station was renamed Cottesloe and became a regular stop for trains.

The station closed on 1 September 1979 along with the rest of the Fremantle line, re-opening on 29 July 1983 when services were restored. Cottesloe was previously the junction for a now lifted parallel freight line that ran to the Leighton Marshalling Yard.

Station location
Cottesloe station is located on the eastern edge of Cottesloe near the boundary with Peppermint Grove. The tracks lie between Curtin Avenue and Railway Street, two important roads in the area. There are two access points from each of these roads: At the southern end of the platform a pedestrian bridge provides access by stairs to the platform; those on the northern end of the platform require crossing the tracks at grade level to reach the platform.

Services
Cottesloe station is served by Transperth Fremantle line services from Fremantle to Perth that continue through to Midland via the Midland line.

Cottesloe station saw 261,865 passengers in the 2013–14 financial year.

Platforms
Cottesloe station had three platforms. During electrification of the line in 1991, the original northbound platform became southbound and the goods platform was converted for northbound services with the original southbound platform now disused. The goods line originally headed north to service the local Eureka flour mill. A graded grass corridor still marks the site of the track. There was once a staffed signal cabin on the western end of the station.

Bus routes
A regular bus service stops on the eastern side of the station. Bus route 102 operates at 30-minute intervals with Cottesloe station acting as its terminus. Rail replacement route 906 uses the western side of the station on Curtin Avenue but only operates to replace trains during line closures.

References

Cottesloe, Western Australia
Fremantle line
Railway stations in Perth, Western Australia
Railway stations in Australia opened in 1884